Idema is a Dutch and West Frisian patronymic surname meaning "son of Ide". Variant forms are Iedema, IJdema, and Ydema. People with the surname include:

Dan Idema (born 1985), Canadian poker player
David Cole Idema (born 1950), American soft rock singer
Jonathan Idema (1956–2012), American bounty hunter and vigilante running a private prison in Afghanistan
Wilt L. Idema (born 1944), Dutch Sinologist and Harvard University professor

See also
IDEMA

References

Patronymic surnames
Surnames of Dutch origin
Surnames of Frisian origin
Lists of people by surname